Compass-G1, also known as Beidou-2 G1, is a Chinese navigation satellite which will become part of the Compass navigation system. It was launched in January 2010, and became the third Compass satellite to be launched after Compass-M1 and Compass-G2.

Compass-G1 was launched at 16:12 GMT on 16 January 2010, and was the first orbital launch to be conducted in 2010. The launch used a Long March 3C carrier rocket, flying from the Xichang Satellite Launch Centre. It was the first flight of a Long March 3 series rocket since an upper stage engine problem in August 2009 which left the Palapa-D satellite in a lower than planned orbit. The injection systems on the rocket's third stage engines had filters fitted to them in an attempt to prevent a recurrence of this failure. The Compass-G1 launch demonstrated this new system.

Compass-G1 had originally been scheduled for launch in the first half of 2009, however it was subsequently delayed after issues developed with the Beidou-1D and Compass-G2 satellites.

See also

2010 in spaceflight
USA-206

References

Spacecraft launched in 2010
Satellites of China